Gameleira is a city in Pernambuco, Brazil. The name Gameleira is derived from the large number of Gameleira trees (family Moraceae) that were growing in the region. The city is 99 km away from Recife, the capital city of Pernambuco. Gameleira has a bus terminal, a public library, two state schools and several municipal schools.

History
The district of Gameleira was created by Provincial Law 763 (Lei Provincial n° 763), on July 11, 1867.  It was then part of the municipality of Sirinhaém. In 1872, it became a village (Lei Provincial n° 1.057).  In 1860, the  established a station in Gameleira. Local sugarcane plantations used the railroad to transport sugar to the port in Recife.

Geography
 State - Pernambuco
 Region - Zona da mata Pernambucana
 Boundaries - Ribeirão  (N);  Água Preta (S and W);   Rio Formoso and Ribeirão  (E)
 Area - 257.72 km2
 Elevation - 101 m
 Hydrography - Una and Sirinhaém Rivers
 Vegetation - Subcaducifólia forest
 Climate - Hot tropical and humid
 Annual average temperature - 25.1 c
 Distance to Recife - 94 km

Economy
The main economic activities in Gameleira are based in agribusiness, especially plantation of sugarcane; and creations of cattle and buffalos.

Economic indicators

Economy by Sector

Health indicators

References

External links 

 Official website

Municipalities in Pernambuco